Alemayehu Tegenu is an Ethiopian politician who is the current Ambassador to Russia. He was also the Ethiopian Minister of Water, Irrigation and Energy.

See also
 Energy in Ethiopia

References

External links

Year of birth missing (living people)
Energy in Ethiopia
Living people
Government ministers of Ethiopia
21st-century Ethiopian politicians